Kumlienia hystricula (formerly Ranunculus hystriculus) is a species of flowering plant in the buttercup family known by the common name waterfall false buttercup.

Description
Kumlienia hystricula is a small perennial herb growing from fleshy roots and a thick caudex. It produces a basal rosette of hairless green leaves which are rounded with several round lobes. Each leaf is one to three centimeters wide and is borne on a long petiole. From the patch emerge several inflorescences on erect to drooping peduncles up to about 20 centimeters tall. Each flower has 5 or 6 white sepals which look like petals. The actual petals are much smaller, shiny yellow-green structures curving around the center of the bloom. There are many stamens and pistils in the center. The fruits are bristly, lance-shaped bodies a few millimeters long and clustered together.

Distribution
Kumlienia hystricula is endemic to the Sierra Nevada in California, where it grows in wet areas in the coniferous forests of the range.

External links
Jepson Manual Treatment - Kumlienia hystricula
USDA Plants Profile
Photo gallery

Ranunculaceae
Endemic flora of California
Flora of the Sierra Nevada (United States)
Flora without expected TNC conservation status